Lucy Ellen Guernsey (August 12, 1826 – November 3, 1899) was a 19th-century American author who lived in Rochester, New York. She was a strong proponent of early education and moral development in children, although she never had children of her own. Throughout her most productive years (1855–85) she wrote over 60 novels, most of which were published by the American Sunday School Union. She was an active member of the Rochester community; she founded the first sewing school for working-class children and was involved establishing the Home for Aged Women. She edited a popular religious publication, The Parish Visitor, taught an adult biblical class for Sunday School, and was the president of the Christ Church Missionary Society (1881–85).

Family 
Lucy and her sister Clara were daughters of James T. and Electra Guernsey. Her father, James, was a Rochester-area businessman and philanthropist who helped build up his community of western New York in both a cultural and moral fashion. In addition to his business ventures, he was largely responsible for introducing horticulture into the area. James was also known as an anti-slavery activist long before the abolitionist movement gained traction in the North, but among the community he was best known as a friend of the Native Americans. Among the famous Seneca chiefs he befriended, he was most intimate with Red Jacket and Cornplanter. When Lucy and Clara were young, her father invited twenty or thirty Seneca braves to stay in their house. This had a profound impact on Clara’s development, as she later went on to write about the Seneca tribes, aid them during a food shortage, and become a daughter of a local tribe. Although Lucy didn’t have as deep of a connection to the Seneca’s later in life, she was also a great friend like her father.

Work and involvement 
From an early age, Guernsey showed high potential for literary success later in life. After being home schooled she attended Miss Araminta Doolittle’s academy where she was noted as a model of “decorum and studiousness.” In later years, Guernsey devoted herself to charity work and editorial work at St. Luke’s church. She was an active member of the Rochester Female Charitable Society and a lifelong member of St. Luke’s church. Towards the beginning of her career as an author, she wrote for magazines such as Atlantic Monthly and Harpers, in addition to her publications with the American Sunday School Union. Guernsey worked with another religious publishing firm formerly known as Thomas Nelson and Sons (currently Thomas Nelson). During the last 11 productive years of her life she was in charge of editing the Parish Visitor, a religious publication intended for distribution in prisons, homes, and hospitals.

Literary genre 
A majority of Guernsey’s novels can be classified as works of domestic fictions. She often focused on problems associated with reaching responsible maturity and the implication of family life during these developmental times. In particular, Guernsey is most distinguished for her astute observations of people and animals as well as her natural dialogue. Often the American Sunday School Union publications were short pamphlets, yet Guernsey would write 200-page novels. Due to the sheer volume of her work, Guernsey was criticized for poorly constructed plots, but nevertheless, the content and morals of her stories were representative of the community’s preferred juvenile teachings.

Literary works 
Alice and Bessie
Binney the Beaver and Other Stories
Blue Socks; or, Count the Cost
The Chevalier's Daughter: Being One of the Stanton Corbet Chronicles
The Child's Treasure of Stories
Christmas at Cedar Hill: A Holiday Story-Book
The Christmas Earnings; or, Ethel Fletcher's Temptation
Claribel; or, Rest at Last
Cousin Deborah's Story, or, The Great Plague
Cub’s Apple; or, Next Time
A Dark Night; or, Fear of Man Bringeth a Snare
Duty and Inclination 
Ethel’s Trial in Becoming a Missionary
The Fairchilds; or, Do What You Can
The Foster-Sisters: or, Lucy Corbet's Chronicle
Grandmother Brown's School-Days; or, Education As It Was Seventy Years Since
The Heiress of McGregor; or, Living for Self
Henry Willson's Voyage: or, Only in Fun
The Hidden Treasure: A Tale Of Troublous Times
Irish Amy
Jenny and the Birds
Jenny and the Insects, or, Little Toilers and Their Industries
Kitty Maynard; or, To Obey Is Better Than Sacrifice
Lady Betty's Governess: or, The Corbet Chronicles
Lady Rosamond's Book; or, Dawnings of Light - Second Part of The Stanton-Corbet Chronicles
Langham Revels; or, The Fair Dame of Stanton
A Lent In Earnest; or, Sober Thoughts for Solemn Days
Loveday's History: A Tale of Many Changes
Mabel, or, The Bitter Root, A Tale of the Times of James the First
Meat-eaters, with Some Account of Their Haunts and Habits 
Milly; or, The Hidden Cross.
Miss Georgine’s Husband
The Mission-Box; or, Doing Good and getting Good
The Mother's Mission: Sketches from Real Life
Myra Sherwood's Cross, and How She Bore It
Nellie; or, the Best Inheritance
No Talent and Phil’s Pansies
The Object of Life
Old Stanfield House
Oldham; or, Beside All Waters
Only in Fun; or, Henry Wilson’s Voyage
Opposite Neighbours
Orphan Nieces; or, Duty and Inclination
Pattie Durant: A tale of 1662
Percy's Holidays
Ready Work for Willing Hands: or, The Story of Edith Allison
The Red Plant
Rhoda's Education; or, Too Much of a Good Thing
The School-Girls' Treasury; or, Stories for Thoughtful Girls
Sophie Kennedy's Experience
The Sign of the Cross
Story of a Hessian: A Tale of the Revolution in New Jersey
Straight Forward
The Straight Path
Sunday-School Exhibition and its Consequences
Sword of De Bardwell
Tabby's and Her Travels; or, The Holiday Adventures of a Kitten: A Christmas and New-Year's Story
The Tame Turtle: or, Geordie McGregor's Trouble
The Tattler; or, The History of Patty Steele
Three Girls of the Revolution
Through Unknown Ways: or, The Journal-Books of Mrs. Dorathea Studley
The Twin Roses And How They Were Trained
Unknown Ways
Upward and Onward; or, The History of Rob. Merritt
Washington and Seventy-Six. By Lucy E. And Clara F. Guernsey
Willing to Be Useful, or, Principle and Duty Illustrated in the Story Of Edith Allison
Winifred, or, After Many Days
Winifred; or, English Maiden in the Seventeenth Century

References 

1826 births
1899 deaths
People from Pittsford, New York
Writers from Rochester, New York
American Christian writers
19th-century American women writers
American women children's writers
American children's writers
American women non-fiction writers